Mawolo "Gabe" Gissie (born November 23, 1996) is a Liberian footballer currently playing for the Rhode Island Reds FC of the NPSL.

Career
After being a member of the New England Revolution academy, Gissie signed his first professional contract on February 11, 2014, joining USL Pro club Sacramento Republic for their inaugural season. Gissie made his professional debut against Arizona United SC as an 87th minute substitute. He was part of the team that won the 2014 USL Pro Championship.

On December 11, 2015, he joined the newly formed Bethlehem Steel FC with Sacramento teammate, Mikey Daly. At the conclusion of the 2016 season, Gissie was released by Steel FC after making 18 appearances and scoring once.

In December 2016, Gissie rejoined Sacramento Republic ahead of the 2017 season.

On May 30, 2019, Gissie made his debut with NPSL side Rhode Island Reds, coming on as a halftime substitute and scoring in the 85th minute.

External
 
 Sacramento Republic FC profile

References

1996 births
Living people
Liberian footballers
Sacramento Republic FC players
Philadelphia Union II players
Association football forwards
USL Championship players
Sportspeople from Monrovia